The Belt Railway Company of Chicago , headquartered in Bedford Park, IL, is the largest switching terminal railroad in the United States.  It is co-owned by six Class I railroads — BNSF Railway, Canadian National Railway, Canadian Pacific Railway (the BRC's north-south main line's northern terminus is, like the Indiana Harbor Belt, the Milwaukee District West Line in Chicago's Cragin neighborhood), CSX Transportation, Norfolk Southern Railway, and Union Pacific Railroad — each of which uses the switching and interchange facilities of the BRC.  Owner lines and other railroads bring their trains to the Belt Railway to be separated, classified, and re-blocked into new trains for departure.  The BRC also provides rail terminal services to approximately 100 local manufacturing industries.  The company employs about 440 people, including its own police force.

BRC trackage
The BRC has 28 miles (45 km) of mainline route with interchanges to each of its owner railroads, and over 300 miles (500 km) of switching tracks.  The vast majority of the latter are located in the Clearing Yard.

Clearing Yard

The Clearing Yard, located on the boundary between Chicago and Bedford Park, Illinois, just south of Chicago Midway International Airport directly adjacent to CSX Intermodal’s Bedford Park terminal, is one of the largest hump classification facilities in the United States.  Some 5.5 miles in length and covering 786 acres (3.2 km²), the yard supports more than 250 miles (400 km) of track.  It has six main subdivisions; one arrival, classification, and departure yard in the eastbound and westbound directions.

At the heart of the yard is the wicket-shaped tower which straddles the hump and from which are controlled the switches and retarders of both east- and westbound classification yards to either side of it.  Using computer controls, the hump tower efficiently dispatches more than 8,400 rail cars per day.  Operating around the clock, employees are able to classify between 40 and 50 miles of consists daily.

Locomotives 
The BRC was noted for a fleet of Alco-built locomotives, even though Alco did not build locomotives in the United States after 1970. Specifically, the BRC owned six 2400HP C424's numbered 600-605. All six locomotives were removed from BRC's roster and sold. 600 and 601 have been scrapped. BRC currently operates rebuilt Electro-Motive Diesel locomotives, such as the SD38, SD40, GP38, and 1500-series switchers. As is popular in large hump yards, slugs are used in Clearing Yard to shove the hump.

Awards and recognition 
The Belt Railway Company of Chicago has been honored several times with E. H. Harriman Awards, in the switching and terminal railways category, for employee safety, including a gold award for 1999.

See also

Rail transportation in the United States

References

External links

 Belt Railway of Chicago (official site)
  RAILChicago 
  Shortlines of Chicago Historical Society BRC history

Illinois railroads
Railroads in the Chicago metropolitan area
Switching and terminal railroads
Railway companies established in 1882
Rail yards in Illinois
BNSF Railway
CSX Transportation
Norfolk Southern Railway
Union Pacific Railroad
Canadian National Railway
Canadian Pacific Railway